José Vicente Campos Carnota (born July 27, 1992) is a Venezuelan professional baseball pitcher for the Pericos de Puebla of the Mexican League. He previously played for the Arizona Diamondbacks.

Career
Prior to the 2012 season, John Sickels of Minorleagueball.com considered him the Seattle Mariners' fifth best prospect for 2012.

New York Yankees
On January 13, 2012, Campos and Michael Pineda were traded to the New York Yankees for Jesús Montero and Héctor Noesí. He was added to the 40-man roster on November 20, 2013. He underwent Tommy John surgery in April 2014 and missed the season. After the 2014 season, the Yankees non-tendered Campos, and then signed him to a minor league contract. Campos was added to the 40-man roster on November 4, 2015.

Arizona Diamondbacks
On July 31, 2016, the Yankees traded Campos to the Diamondbacks for Tyler Clippard. The Diamondbacks promoted Campos to the major leagues on August 25.

Los Angeles Angels
On November 4, the Angels claimed Campos off of waivers. He was released by the organization on May 15, 2018.

New Britain Bees
On June 26, 2018, Campos signed with the New Britain Bees of the Atlantic League of Professional Baseball.

Sugar Land Skeeters
On July 13, 2018, Campos signed with the Sugar Land Skeeters of the Atlantic League of Professional Baseball. He became a free agent following the 2018 season.

Pittsburgh Pirates
On January 30, 2019, Campos signed a minor league deal with the Pittsburgh Pirates. He was released on June 21, 2019.

Lincoln Saltdogs
On June 29, 2019, Campos signed with the Lincoln Saltdogs of the American Association.

Pericos de Puebla
On July 2, 2019, Campos's contract was purchased by the Pericos de Puebla of the Mexican League. He was released on July 24, 2019.

Parma Baseball
On April 16, 2021,Campos signed with Parma Baseball in Italy. On July 17, 2021, he contributed to the victory of the 14th European Champions Cup for Parma Baseball.

Pericos de Puebla (second stint)
On July 14, 2022, Campos signed with the Pericos de Puebla of the Mexican League. He appeared in 12 games going 0–1 with a 3.09 ERA and 11 strikeouts in 11.2 innings.

International career
Campos was selected to represent Spain at the 2023 World Baseball Classic qualification.

Personal life
Campos is cousin to shortstop Alcides Escobar, and pitchers Edwin Escobar and Kelvim Escobar, as well as nephew of shortstop José Escobar.

See also
 List of Major League Baseball players from Venezuela

References

External links

Pelota Binaria (Venezuelan Winter League)

1992 births
Living people
Arizona Diamondbacks players
Arizona League Angels players
Cardenales de Lara players
Charleston RiverDogs players
Vicente
Everett AquaSox players
Gulf Coast Yankees players
Inland Empire 66ers of San Bernardino players
Lincoln Saltdogs players
Major League Baseball pitchers
Major League Baseball players from Venezuela
Mobile BayBears players
People from La Guaira
Pericos de Puebla players
Reno Aces players
Salt Lake Bees players
Scranton/Wilkes-Barre RailRiders players
Tampa Yankees players
Trenton Thunder players
Venezuelan expatriate baseball players in Italy
Venezuelan expatriate baseball players in Mexico
Venezuelan expatriate baseball players in the United States
Venezuelan Summer League Mariners players
Altoona Curve players
Sugar Land Skeeters players